The West End Hospital is a 40-bed private health care facility in Kumasi, Ghana. It is popularly known as the "Kwakye-Maafo Hospital" because of its distinguished services in fertility, obstetrics and gynaecology by the founder, Dr. J.K. Kwakye-Maafo, a medical practitioner and former president of the Ghana Medical Association.

History
West End Hospital (named after the famous Westend Klinikum in West Berlin, Germany) was established in 1978 as a clinic. By 1985 it had grown into a hospital providing various in-patient and out-patient services to the Kumasi metropolis in the Ashanti region of Ghana. It is located at Patasi, opposite the police depot in Kumasi, the capital of the Ashanti Region. It has over 40 staff.

Departments and facilities 
 General medicine
 Paediatrics
 General surgery
 Obstetrics and gynaecology/ultrasound
 ECG services
 EPI programmes
 MCH services
 Family planning/voluntary counselling
 Pharmaceutical services
 Laboratory and diagnostic services
 Healthcare services training

See also 
 Komfo Anokye Teaching Hospital
 National Health Insurance Scheme (Ghana)
 List of hospitals in Ghana

References

External links
 West End Hospital official website

Hospital buildings completed in 1978
Hospitals established in 1978
Hospitals in Ghana
Ashanti Region